The 2019 Vietnamese National Cup (known as the Bamboo Airways National Cup for sponsorship reasons) season is the 27th edition of the Vietnamese Cup, the football knockout competition of Vietnam organized by the Vietnam Football Federation.

First round

Second round

Quarter-Final round

Semi-final round

Final round

References

Brackets

Vietnamese National Cup
Vietnam
Cup